Sint-Anna-Pede is a village in Itterbeek, Belgium, which is a deelgemeente of Dilbeek. It gets its name from the Pedebeek, the stream that flows through the village.

Sint-Anna-Pede was already mentioned in the first half of the 12th century as "Pethe"; later also as "capelle beatissima Anna in Peda" and as "apud Pede juxta nova capella", which means that there was possibly an older building at the same site.

Attractions 
 the Sint-Anna Church : 13th century Roman church, restored in the 17th century in the Gothic style. It is depicted on The Blind Leading the Blind, a painting by Pieter Bruegel the Elder. It has had Protected status since 1948. 
 the Bruegel Museum: 12 large reproductions of landscapes by Pieter Brueghel, who came to the area looking for inspiration.
 the Zeventien bruggen (seventeen bridges): a concrete viaduct of 520m long and 28 m high across the valley of the Pedebeek. Sixteen of the bridges are part of the viaduct, while the seventeenth bridge lies under one of the arches. 
 the Klein Sint-Anna-kasteeltje (Small Saint-Anna Castle): Castle where according to the legend Charles V of Spain, Brueghel and Louis Quatorze would have slept.

References

Dilbeek
Populated places in Flemish Brabant